The Years of Dreams and Revolt is a Canadian drama film, directed by Jean-Claude Labrecque and released in 1984. A sequel to his 1975 film The Vultures (Les Vautours), the film revisits the story of Louis Pelletier (Gilbert Sicotte) in the 1960s, from the time of his wedding to Claudette (Anne-Marie Provencher) in 1963 through to the time of the October Crisis in 1970.

The cast also includes Monique Mercure, Carmen Tremblay and Amulette Garneau, all reprising their roles as his aunts, as well as John Wildman, Roger Lebel, Lothaire Bluteau, Jean-Guy Bouchard and Guillaume Lemay-Thivierge.

The film premiered in the Directors' Fortnight stream at the 1984 Cannes Film Festival, before having its Canadian premiere at the 1984 Toronto International Film Festival.

Vianney Gauthier received a Genie Award nomination for Best Art Direction/Production Design at the 6th Genie Awards in 1985.

References

External links

1984 films
Films directed by Jean-Claude Labrecque
Canadian drama films
Films set in Quebec
Films shot in Quebec
Canadian sequel films
1984 drama films
1980s French-language films
French-language Canadian films
1980s Canadian films